The Missing Girl may refer to:

 The Missing Girl (film), a 2015 American film
 "The Missing Girl" (Celebrity Deathmatch), an episode of Celebrity Deathmatch